USS LST-1030 was a  in the United States Navy during World War II. She was transferred to the Republic of China Navy as ROCS Chung Chuan (LST-221).

Construction and commissioning 
LST-1030 was laid down on 27 May 1944 at Boston Navy Yard, Boston, Massachusetts. Launched on 25 June 1944 and commissioned on 19 July 1944.

Service in the United States Navy 
During World War II, LST-1030 was assigned to the Asiatic-Pacific theater. She then participated in the Lingayen Gulf landing on 9 January 1945 and Assault and occupation of Okinawa Gunto from 1 April to 30 June 1945. She was assigned to occupation and China from 12 September 1945 to 29 May 1946.

She was decommissioned on 29 May 1946 and struck from the Naval Register on 12 March 1948 after she was transferred to the Republic of China and renamed Chung Chaun (LST-202).

Service in the Republic of China Navy 
Her original pennant number was LST-202, and it was changed to the logistics fleet repair ship in September 1952 with the number ARL-335.

She was later renamed ROCS Heng Shan (ARL-335) in August 1953.

Her name changed back to Chung Chuan in January 1958 with pennant number LST-221.

In November 1994, she underwent refit at the Hai No. 4 Factory.

On 16 July 2018, she was used as a target ship and was sunk off Lanyu by the Hsiung Feng III anti-ship missile.

Awards 
LST-1033 have earned the following awards:

China Service Medal (extended) 
American Campaign Medal 
Asiatic-Pacific Campaign Medal (2 battle stars)
World War II Victory Medal
Navy Occupation Service Medal (with Asia clasp) 
Philippine Presidential Unit Citation 
Philippine Liberation Medal (1 battle star)

Citations

Sources 
 
 
 
 

LST-542-class tank landing ships
Ships built in Boston
World War II amphibious warfare vessels of the United States
LST-542-class tank landing ships of the Republic of China Navy
1944 ships